SID1 transmembrane family member 1 is a protein that in humans is encoded by the SIDT1 gene.

Function

The protein encoded by this gene belongs to SID1 family of transmembrane dsRNA-gated channels. Family members transport dsRNA into cells and are required for systemic RNA interference.

References

Further reading